A cupula is a small, inverted cup or dome-shaped cap over a structure, including:
 Ampullary cupula, a structure in the vestibular system, providing the sense of spatial orientation
 Cochlear cupula, a structure in the cochlea
 Cupula of the pleura, related to the lungs
The cervical parietal pleura in the thorax
A layer in the otolith organs
 The cupula optica, or optic cup, in embryological development of the eye
 Cup-like structure fitted over the eye during electrophysiology study
 Suprapleural membrane

See also
 Cupola (disambiguation)
 Copula (disambiguation)
 Cupule (disambiguation)